This is a glossary of properties and concepts in algebraic topology in mathematics.

See also: glossary of topology, list of algebraic topology topics, glossary of category theory, glossary of differential geometry and topology, Timeline of manifolds.

Convention: Throughout the article, I denotes the unit interval, Sn the n-sphere and Dn the n-disk. Also, throughout the article, spaces are assumed to be reasonable; this can be taken to mean for example, a space is a CW complex or compactly generated weakly Hausdorff space. Similarly, no attempt is made to be definitive about the definition of a spectrum. A simplicial set is not thought of as a space; i.e., we generally distinguish between simplicial sets and their geometric realizations.
Inclusion criterion: As there is no glossary of homological algebra in Wikipedia right now, this glossary also includes a few concepts in homological algebra (e.g., chain homotopy); some concepts in geometric topology and differential topology are also fair game. On the other hand, the items that appear in glossary of topology are generally omitted. Abstract homotopy theory and motivic homotopy theory are also outside the scope. Glossary of category theory covers (or will cover) concepts in theory of model categories. See the glossary of symplectic geometry for the topics in symplectic topology such as quantization.

!$@

A

B

C

D

E

F

G

H

I

J

K

L

M

N

O

P

Q

R

S

T

U

V

W

Notes

References 

 Lectures delivered by Michael Hopkins and Notes by Akhil Mathew, Harvard.

 (despite the title, it contains a significant amount of general results.)
 
 the 1970 MIT notes

Further reading 
 José I. Burgos Gil, The Regulators of Beilinson and Borel
 Lectures on groups of homotopy spheres by JP Levine

External links 
Algebraic Topology: A guide to literature

Algebraic topology
Algebraic topology
Wikipedia glossaries using description lists